The 2021 Mississippi State Bulldogs football team represented Mississippi State University in the 2021 NCAA Division I FBS football season. The Bulldogs played their home games at Davis Wade Stadium in Starkville, Mississippi, and competed in the Western Division of the Southeastern Conference (SEC). They were led by second-year head coach Mike Leach.

Coaching staff
Staff from 2021.

SEC Media Days
In the preseason media poll, Mississippi State was predicted to finish last in the West Division.

Regular season

Schedule

Game summaries

Louisiana Tech

Sources:

NC State

Sources:

at Memphis

Sources:

LSU

Sources:

at No. 15 Texas A&M

Sources:

No. 5 Alabama

Sources:

at Vanderbilt

Sources:

No. 12 Kentucky

Sources:

at Arkansas

Sources:

at No. 17 Auburn

Sources:

Tennessee State

Sources:

No. 9 Ole Miss

Sources:

vs. Texas Tech

Sources:

Rankings

Statistics

Scoring

Scores by quarter (non-conference opponents)

Scores by quarter (SEC opponents)

Team statistics

References

Mississippi State
Mississippi State Bulldogs football seasons
Mississippi State Bulldogs football